Thomas Zilliacus is a Finnish businessperson and philanthropist . He is the Founder and Chairman of Mobile FutureWorks Group, a multinational conglomerate active in digital media, e-commerce, online payments, mobile games and real estate . A resident of Singapore, he has set up or been involved in businesses in China, South Korea, India, Thailand, Malaysia, and Indonesia, as well as Europe and Australia.

Early life and education
Thomas Zilliacus was born in Helsinki, Finland in 1964. He comes from a prominent Finnish family whose members since the 19th century have held leading positions in politics, culture, science and business in Finland Zilliacus. 
His greatgreatgrandfather was senator Henrik Wilhelm Johan Zilliacus, who in 1866 was elected Mayor of Finland's capital Helsinki . His greatgrandfather Henrik Johan Wilhelm Zilliacus  was a doctor and activist who co-founded Finland's leading private hospital Eira, while his greatgranduncle was Konni Zilliacus, a prominent writer and the founder of the Finnish Activist Resistance Party which sought to liberate Finland from Russia. His granduncle was Per Zilliacus, the head of the Finnish Military Academy and the Commander of the Finnish Civil Guard .

Thomas Zilliacus went to school in Zilliacuska skolan (Zillen), a private school set up by his grandfather's uncle Laurin Zilliacus . Immediately upon graduating, Zilliacus enrolled in 1972 at the University of Helsinki (HU) as well as at the Helsinki Swedish School of Business and Economics (Hanken). Building on what he had learned in Zillen, he was heavily involved in student politics. He was three times elected as chairman of the Student Union of Helsinki University. He was also for three years the editor-in-chief of the national student paper Studentbladet. Zilliacus was also a soccer player and took off from studies for one term and spent one season in the Youth Academy of the Brazilian soccer champions Fluminense in Rio de Janeiro.

Political career
The Helsinki University Student Union was heavily politicised in the 1970s. Several members of the decision-making bodies of the Student Union became national political leaders. Finnish Prime Ministers such as Anneli Jaatteenmaki, Esko Aho and Matti Vanhanen all were active in the Student Union in the 1970s. Zilliacus was elected in 1979 as the youngest member to the Helsinki City Council and also ran for the National Parliament. He was in 1984 re-elected for a second 4-year period to the Helsinki City Council, but his period was cut short when he moved to Singapore.

Business career

Nokia
Zilliacus became global head of corporate communications of Finnish corporation Nokia in 1980. He helped shift Nokia's public image from that of a manufacturer of rubber boots, rubber tires and cables to that of a manufacturer of new technology, most prominently mobile phones and mobile networks. He also convinced Nokia's then-CEO Kari Kairamo to change the brand name of Nokia's mobile phones from Mobira to Nokia.

In 1986, Zilliacus moved to Singapore to spearhead Nokia's entry into Asia as regional head of Nokia's Asia-Pacific business and as CEO of Nokia SouthEast Asia Pte Ltd. He was also named chairman of Nokia Malaysia Sdn Bhd. He suggested that Nokia in Asia should focus on mobile phones and mobile networks, a strategy that the entire company a few years later followed. During his seven years as regional head for Asia-Pacific he spearheaded Nokia's first sales of mobile networks and entry into mobile phones in Asia.

Mobile FutureWorks
In 1993, Zilliacus resigned from Nokia and founde an investment company called Mobile FutureWorks Group (MFW).  He formed an advisory board that included Pekka Tarjanne, former Minister of Communications of Finland and General Secretary of ITU, Sven-Christer Nilsson, the former CEO of Ericsson, Jorma Nieminen, the former CEO of Nokia Mobile Phones, and Koh Boon Hwee, the former chairman of Singapore Telecom. MFW became the first investor in OpenMobile Corporation, a Finnish startup founded by Pekka Palin focused on the distribution of mobile VAS. Zilliacus was elected as executive chairman of OpenMobile. He co-founded the Mobile Entertainment Forum, a global organisation for companies involved in mobile VAS, and was its first chairman.

YuuZoo
After OpenMobile in 2007 was sold, Zilliacus co-founded YuuZoo Corporation, a company focused on social media, e-commerce, mobile games and payments. The platform was licensed for each overseas market and run by local entrepreneurs. YuuZoo subsequently expanded into multiple markets in Asia, Europe, Africa and the Middle East and was listed in 2014 on the mainboard of the Singapore Stock Exchange (SGX). Zilliacus resigned as executive chairman in April 2018 .

Sandbox, Newkia, Ignisdraco
On the day that Nokia announced it had sold its mobile business to Microsoft, Zilliacus announced the formation of Newkia (a play on "New" and "Nokia").

In 2014, Zilliacus invested into Sandbox, a developer of online games, and changed the focus from online games to mobile games. He also built Ignisdraco Group, a developer of and investor in real estate. The company, which has an advisory board that includes Finland's former Prime Minister Anneli Jaatteenmaki and Kimmo Sasi, former Minister of Foreign Trade, has announced a multi-billion USD real estate project in Harbin in NorthEast China, focused on new technology in urban and city planning and management .

Board and advisory positions
Zilliacus has held several board and advisory positions in listed as well as non-listed companies. He was the lead independent director of SGX-listed S i2i Limited (formerly, Spice i2i Ltd), he was a member of the advisory board at Scanbuy, and has served as director of India's S Mobility Limited (now Spice Mobility Limited Spice Digital company), and a director of India's Wall Street Finance Ltd. He is the chairman of is the co-founder and was the First Chairman of the Mobile Entertainment Forum..

Sport and entertainment career

From 1982 to 1986, Zilliacus was chairman of the Finnish football champions HJK. After moving to Singapore he managed the Singapore football champion Geylang International from 1989 to 1995. He was through an investment company a major investor in Finland's largest indoor stadium Hartwall Areena and an owner of Finnish icehockey champions Jokerit until the arena and the team in 2012 were sold to Russian investors. He is the founder and former chairman of Finnish model agency Paparazzi and is the chairman of Korean SuperTalent of the World.

References

External links
 About Mobile FutureWorks

Nokia people
Living people
Finnish businesspeople
Year of birth missing (living people)
Finnish expatriates in Singapore